St. Mary's Church, Dublin is a former Church of Ireland building on the corner of Mary Street and Jervis Street, Dublin, and adjacent to Wolfe Tone Square. From the 17th century the church was a place of worship for parishioners on Dublin's north-side, before it was closed in 1986. The church has since been deconsecrated and the building is now a pub and restaurant. The parish also had a chapel of ease - St Mary's - off Dorset Street, more commonly known as "The Black Church".

History

From the early middle-ages, the north-side of Dublin was served by the parish of St. Michan's and the abbey of St. Mary. After the dissolution of the monasteries, the abbey was all but closed, and in the late 17th century, the parish of St. Mary's was formed. As recorded by the original register book of the "Parish of St. Maries" (St. Mary's), the parish "was separated from the Parish of St. Michans, & made a district Parish by Act of Parliament" on 20 November 1697.

The current building was designed in 1697 by Sir William Robinson, and the foundation stone was laid in 1700. Some of the church construction was overseen by Thomas Burgh, and the church is notable as the first in Dublin to be built with galleries. It was consecrated in 1701. The organ of the church was built by Renatus Harris.

The church was one of the first large buildings in the area to be constructed on the newly laid out Mary Street, and was under construction at the same time as nearby Langford House.

The parish register records that the first rector was Peter Broun (or Browne), later Provost of Trinity College, and that the first church wardens were Robert Rochfort, the Attorney General, and Allen Brodrick, Solicitor General.

Closure
The church closed in 1986 and became a retail outlet after deconsecration. It was later converted to use as a pub and restaurant. Originally named the "John M. Keating Bar", the pub changed hands in 2007 and is now simply called "The Church".

The churchyard was converted into Wolfe Tone Square, a public park where the gravestones can be seen stacked up at the southern end.

Notable parishioners and burials
Arthur Guinness was married in St Mary's in 1761. Notable baptisms in the church include Seán O'Casey in 1880 and Theobald Wolfe Tone in 1763. (Wolfe Tone was born at 44 Stafford Street nearby. Stafford Street was later renamed after Wolfe Tone.)  The Earl of Charlemont was baptized in the church in 1728, and Richard Brinsley Sheridan in 1751.

Records show that burials in the church vaults include Anne, daughter of the Bishop of Meath (interred 14 December 1725), the Rev Rawlinson Foord (also interred 14 December 1725), and Charles Campbell (interred in the chancel vault 2 November 1765). All the remains of those in the vault or crypts were later cremated and placed at St. Michans. This process was supervised by a Dublin Corporation Environmental Officer in consultation with the Representative Body of the Church of Ireland.

The adjoining churchyard is the final resting place of the United Irishman Archibald Hamilton Rowan (1751–1834), Mary Mercer, founder of Mercer's Hospital (died 1734), the philosopher Francis Hutcheson (1694–1746), Sir Boyle Roche, 1st Baronet (1736–1807), the Anglo-Irish politician Henry Maxwell, parish rector William Fletcher (1715–1771), and Lord Norbury (1745–1831; known colloquially as the hanging judge).

Notes and references

External links
 The Church Café, Bar and Restaurant website

1627 establishments in Ireland
1986 disestablishments in Ireland

Former churches in the Republic of Ireland
Pubs in Dublin (city)
Church of Ireland churches in Dublin (city)